O'Henry Sound Studios was a commercial studio complex in Burbank, California, that was owned by engineer Hank Sanicola and his wife, Jacqueline Sanicola.  Hank's father, Hank Sanicola, Sr. (1914–1974), was a long time manager (until 1962) for Frank Sinatra.

History

The facility opened in 1993, designed with the help of architect Jack Edwards and studio consultant Rick Ruggieri. The studio closed in 2005.

Notable recordings

Album projects
R.E.M.
k.d. lang
Mariah Carey
Ray Charles
Sugar Ray
Shakira
Tool
Wallflowers
Anastacia
Caifanes
Ray Conniff
Al Stewart

Commercial soundtracks
Southwest Airlines
McDonald's
National Geographic

Film credits
King Kong (2005)
Pooh's Heffalump Movie (2005)
Sideways (2004)
The Jungle Book 2 (2003)
Return to Never Land (2002)
Don't Say a Word (2001)
3000 Miles to Graceland (2001)
Chicken Run (2000)
Dinosaur (2000)
Austin Powers: The Spy Who Shagged Me (1999)
Election (1999)
Life (1999)
Wild Things (1998)
Austin Powers: International Man of Mystery (1997)
Nothing to Lose (1997)
That Thing You Do! (1996)
Delta of Venus (1995)

References

Recording studios in California